Barbicornis  is a monotypic butterfly genus of the family Riodinidae with its single species Barbicornis basilis  present in Paraguay, Brazil and Argentina.

The species is easily recognizable by the very small hindwings provided with a long apex of the tail on the lower
radial (uppermost median) vein. The original description was published in Encyclopédie Méthodique. They drink early in the morning from wet stones and places on roads or tracks and rest during the day beneath leaves.

Subspecies
Barbicornis basilis basilis (Paraguay, Brazil: Espírito Santo, Rio de Janeiro)
Barbicornis basilis acroleuca Berg, 1896 (Paraguay)
Barbicornis basilis bahiana Azzará, 1978 (Brazil: Bahia)
Barbicornis basilis ephippium Thieme, 1907 (Brazil: Rio Grande do Sul)
Barbicornis basilis marginata Seitz, 1913 (Brazil: Bahia)
Barbicornis basilis mona Westwood, 1851 (Paraguay, Brazil: Espírito Santo)
Barbicornis basilis paraopeba Azzará, 1978 (Brazil: Minas Gerais)
Barbicornis basilis tucumana Thieme, 1907 (Argentina)

Sources
Barbicornis sur funet

External links
Butterflies of America High resolution images of type specimens.
TOL

Riodinidae
Riodinidae of South America
Monotypic butterfly genera
Taxa named by Jean-Baptiste Godart